FRS Racing is an American stock car racing team that currently competes in the NASCAR Xfinity Series. The team was founded in 2023 by former Brandonbilt Motorsports technical director, Collin Fern, and they currently field the No. 96 Chevrolet Camaro part-time for Max McLaughlin. The team will have a technical alliance with Richard Childress Racing, who will build their cars and engines.

History 
On February 10, 2023, TobyChristie.com reported that former Brandonbilt Motorsports technical director, Collin Fern, announced that he will be forming his own team, FRS Racing, which will compete in a partial schedule for the 2023 NASCAR Xfinity Series season, and hopes to go full-time in 2024. The team will have a technical alliance with Richard Childress Racing.

NASCAR Xfinity Series

Car No. 96 history 
The team will be set to make their Xfinity Series debut at Richmond Raceway in April, and will also run select races throughout the season, fielding the No. 96 car. The driver and sponsor are set to be announced at a later date. On February 28, the team announced that dirt track racer Max McLaughlin will drive their No. 96 car at Watkins Glen, making his debut in the Xfinity Series.

References 

Stock car racing
American auto racing teams
NASCAR teams